The Santander Golf Tour Burgos is a women's professional golf tournament on Spain's Santander Golf Tour that has featured on the LET Access Series. It was first played in 2018 and is held in Burgos, Spain.

Winners

References

External links

LET Access Series events
Golf tournaments in Spain